The United Kingdom was represented in the Eurovision Song Contest 1984 by Belle and the Devotions with the song "Love Games". It was chosen as the British entry through the A Song for Europe national selection process and placed seventh at Eurovision, receiving 63 points.

Before Eurovision

A Song for Europe 1984 
A Song for Europe was used once again to select the British entry, as it had since the United Kingdom's debut at the Contest in 1957. 

The final was held on 4 April 1984 at the Studio 1 of Television Centre, London and was hosted once again by Terry Wogan. The BBC Concert Orchestra under the direction of John Coleman as conductor accompanied all the songs, but all the music was pre-recorded. Of the entrants, songwriter Paul Curtis had no less than four of the eight entries (going on to take three of the top four places). The votes of eight regional juries based in Edinburgh, Norwich, Belfast, London, Cardiff, Manchester, Bristol and Birmingham decided the winner. Each jury region awarded 15 points to their favourite song, 12 points to the second, 10 points to the third and then 9, 8, 7, 6 and 5 points in order of preference for the songs from 4th to 8th. In an plan to modernise the show, computer graphics where used for the first time during the voting.

Singers Sinitta and Hazell Dean would later go on to become successful chart acts - both under the producership of Stock Aitken Waterman. The latter scoring her first top 10 hit just a few weeks after the contest.

UK Discography 
Nina Shaw - Look At Me Now: Red Bus RBUS90.
Bryan Evans - This Love Is Deep: Charisma CB413.
Belle & The Devotions - Love Games: CBS A4332 (7" Single)/TA4332 (12" Single).
First Division - Where The Action Is: Panther PAN3.
Miriam Anne Lesley - Let It Shine: RCA RCA403.
Sinitta - Imagination: Magnet MAG258.
Hazell Dean - Stay In My Life: Proto ENA116.

At Eurovision
Belle & the Devotions were booed at the Contest partly as reaction after English football fans had run riot in Luxembourg a few months earlier, causing extensive damage to the city and by the Dutch delegation in protest that the three backing singers for the group who were in fact performing the song were never seen by the TV viewers (the BBC maintained that this was because one was pregnant) whereas the two members of the Devotions, Laura James and Linda Sofeld, were miming their vocals. Despite the reception, the group finished 7th with 63 points and reaching no.11 in the UK singles chart, the highest chart placing of any UK entry between 1983 and 1994. Sweden ended up winning the competition with the song "Diggi-Loo Diggi-Ley".

Terry Wogan once again provided the television commentary for BBC 1, for the second consecutive year Radio 2 opted not to broadcast the contest, however the contest was broadcast on British Forces Radio with commentary provided by Richard Nankivell. Colin Berry once again served as spokesperson for the UK jury.

Voting

References 

1984
Countries in the Eurovision Song Contest 1984
Eurovision
Eurovision